Jean Shinoda Bolen, M.D. is a psychiatrist,  Jungian analyst, and author. Bolen has written several books on the archetypal psychology of women and men in the development of spirituality, and is one of the women featured in the 1986 film Women – for America, for the World (Academy Award for Best Documentary (Short Subject)) and 1989 National Film Board of Canada documentary Goddess Remembered. Bolen also co-founded (with former husband James Bolen) Psychic magazine in 1969 (renamed New Realities in 1977) covering parapsychology and mind-body-spiritual subjects. Her mother (Megumi Yamaguchi) and aunt (Fumiko Yamaguchi) were both physicians, as were two uncles and her maternal grandfather.

Ken Wilber, in his book Sex, Ecology, and Spirituality expresses his appreciation for Bolen's two books Goddesses in Everywoman, and Gods in Everyman for its "wonderful presentation of all the 'archetypal' gods and goddesses that are collectively inherited by men and women..."

Bolen was a keynote speaker at the 2015 Parliament of the World's Religions in Salt Lake City, Utah.

Books 
 The Tao of Psychology: Synchronicity and the Self, (1979, 1982) ed., 
 Goddesses in Everywoman: A New Psychology of Women (1984)
 Gods in Everyman: A New Psychology of Men's Lives and Loves, (1989)
 The Ring of Power: Symbols and Themes in Wagner's Ring Cycle and in Us, (1992)
 Crossing to Avalon: A Woman's Midlife Pilgrimage (1994)
 Close to the Bone: Life-Threatening Illness and the Search for Meaning, (1996)
 The Millionth Circle: How to Change Ourselves and the World, (1999)
 Goddesses in Older Women: Archetypes in Women over Fifty, (2001)
 Crones Don't Whine, (2003) 
 Urgent Message from Mother: Gather the Women, Save the World, (2005). 2nd ed. (2008) 
 Like a Tree: How Trees, Women, and Tree People Can Save the Planet, (2011) 
 Moving Toward the Millionth Circle: Energizing the Global Women's Movement, (2013) 
 Artemis: The Indomitable Spirit in Everywoman, (2014)

References

External links 
 
 Faculty profile - Omega Institute
 Moments of Truth Jean Shinoda Bolen interviewed on Humankind Public Radio

Living people
American psychiatrists
20th-century American women writers
20th-century American non-fiction writers
21st-century American women writers
American women non-fiction writers
21st-century American non-fiction writers
Year of birth missing (living people)
Pomona College alumni